Hubendickia is a genus of freshwater snails with gills and an operculum, aquatic gastropod mollusks in the family Pomatiopsidae.

Distribution 
The distribution of the genus Hubendickia includes Thailand and China.

Species 
Species within the genus Hubendickia include:
 Hubendickia cingulata Brandt, 1974
 Hubendickia coronata Brandt, 1968
 Hubendickia crooki Brandt, 1968
 Hubendickia cylindrica Brandt, 1974
 Hubendickia gochenouri Brandt, 1968
 Hubendickia pellucida (Bavay, 1895) - synonyms: Pachydrobia pellucida Bavay, 1895; Manningiella pellucida Brandt, 1970
 Hubendickia polita (Brandt, 1970) - synonym: Manningiella polita Brandt, 1970
 Hubendickia rolfbrandti Temcharoen, 1971
 Hubendickia schlickumi (Brandt, 1968) - synonym: Paraprososthenia schlickumi Brandt, 1968
 Hubendickia scheutti (Brandt, 1968) - synonym: Paraprososthenia scheutti Brandt, 1968
 Hubendickia spiralis Brandt, 1968
 Hubendickia sulcata (Bavay, 1895) - synonyms: Pachydrobia sulcata Bavay, 1895; Hubendickia siamensis Brandt, 1968 - type species
 Hubendickia tuberculata Brandt, 1968
 Hubendickia new species from Mekong River, Thailand
 Hubendickia another new species from Mekong River, Thailand

References

Pomatiopsidae